White Wedding is a South African romantic comedy. It tells the story of a road trip adventure embarked by a groom and his best friend as they race across South Africa to attend a wedding.
This film was South Africa's official submission to the 82nd Academy Awards for the Academy Award for Best Foreign Language Film.
White Wedding was released in the U.S. on 3 September 2010 by Dada Films and The Little Film Company.

Plot 
Elvis (Kenneth Nkosi) leaves Johannesburg Park Station for Durban where his best friend Tumi (Rapulana Seiphemo) will drive them to Cape Town to attend his wedding to Ayanda (Zandile Msutwana). Nothing goes according to plan as the two friends trek across the country, meeting eccentric characters along the way, as Ayanda nervously waits in Cape Town.

Cast 
 Kenneth Nkosi as Elvis
 Rapulana Seiphemo as Tumi
 Zandile Msutwana as Ayanda
 Jodie Whittaker as Rose
 Mbulelo Grootboom as Tony
 Lulu Nxozi as Zuki

Reception 
The film was both a moderate critical and commercial success in South Africa and it received mixed reviews internationally. Picktainment.com said, "What White Wedding lacks in exposition, it gains in its honest portrayal of a country still lacerated by racial differences." It grossed R1.1 million in the box office in its first week of opening and had accumulated R4.2 million in a seven-week run.

Awards and nominations

References

External links 
  (defunct)
 

2009 films
2009 romantic comedy films
South African romantic comedy films
2009 directorial debut films
Afrikaans-language films
English-language South African films
Tswana-language films
Xhosa-language films
Zulu-language films
2009 multilingual films
South African multilingual films